André Mattsson (born August 11, 1980) is a retired Haitian-born Swedish ice hockey defenceman. He played for the Norrtälje IK, AIK, Lidingö Vikings, IFK Kumla, Bodens IK, Skellefteå AIK, Djurgårdens IF and Malmö Redhawks of several Swedish leagues (Swedish Hockey League, HockeyAllsvenskan and Division 2), IK Comet of the Norwegian top-level league, the GET-ligaen, and the Manchester Phoenix of the English Premier League.

External links

1980 births
AIK IF players
Black ice hockey players
Djurgårdens IF Hockey players
Haitian emigrants to Sweden
Haitian ice hockey players
IK Comet players
Living people
Malmö Redhawks players
Manchester Phoenix players
Skellefteå AIK players
Sportspeople from Port-au-Prince
Swedish ice hockey defencemen